Seth Lerer (born 1955) is an American scholar and  who specializes in historical analyses of the English language, in addition to critical analyses of the works of several authors, particularly Geoffrey Chaucer. He is a Distinguished Professor of Literature at the University of California, San Diego, where he served as the Dean of Arts and Humanities from 2009 to 2014. He previously held the Avalon Foundation Professorship in Humanities at Stanford University. Lerer won the 2010 Truman Capote Award for Literary Criticism and the 2009 National Book Critics Circle Award in Criticism for Children’s Literature: A Readers’ History from Aesop to Harry Potter.

Life and career 

He was born in Brooklyn, New York City, and was awarded a Bachelor of Arts degree from Wesleyan University in 1976. He gained a second Bachelor of Arts and a Master of Arts degree from the University of Oxford in 1978. He was awarded a Doctor of Philosophy degree by the University of Chicago in 1981. He taught at Princeton University from 1981 to 1990 and at Stanford from 1991 to 2008. In 2009, he joined the faculty of UC-San Diego as Dean of Arts and Humanities and Distinguished Professor of Literature.

He has received grants and fellowships from the John Simon Guggenheim Memorial Foundation, the National Endowment for the Humanities, and the Huntington Library. In 1996 he was the Hurst Visiting Professor at Washington University in St. Louis, and in 2002 he was the Helen Cam Fellow in Medieval Studies at Cambridge University. In 2015 he was the Keeley Visiting Fellow at Wadham College, Oxford. In 2016 he served as the M. H. Abrams Distinguished Visiting Professor at Cornell University.

Lerer's research interests include Medieval Studies, Renaissance studies, comparative philology, history of scholarship and children's literature. He has also published works on the history of reading and the culture of noble courts.

Lerer is widely recognised as a teacher and his facility in Old and Middle English pronunciation, in particular the different dialects of Middle English. Several of his lecture series have been made available commercially.

Published works 
 Boethius and Dialogue (Princeton University Press, 1985).
 Literacy and Power in Anglo-Saxon Literature (University of Nebraska Press, 1991).
 Chaucer and His Readers (Princeton University Press, 1993), awarded the Beatrice White Prize of the English Association of Great Britain.
 Courtly Letters in the Age of Henry VIII (Cambridge University Press, 1997).
 Error and the Academic Self: The Scholarly Imagination, Medieval to Modern (Columbia University Press, 2002), awarded the Harry Levin Prize of the American Comparative Literature Association.
 Inventing English: A Portable History of the Language (Columbia University Press, 2007).
 Children's Literature: A Reader's History from Aesop to Harry Potter (University of Chicago Press, 2008), awarded the National Book Critics Circle Award in Criticism and the Truman Capote Award for Literary Criticism.
 Grahame, K., The Wind in the Willows: An Annotated Edition, edited by Seth Lerer. (Belknap Press / Harvard University Press, 2009).
 Prospero's Son: Life, Books, Love, and Theater  (University of Chicago Press, 2013).
 Shakespeare's Lyric Stage: Myth, Music, and Poetry in the Last Plays (University of Chicago Press, 2018)

References

External links 
Biography, UC-San Diego
"A conversation with Professor Seth Lerer on the history of the book" (2006), online recording
Profile by The Fortnightly

1955 births
Living people
People from Brooklyn
American medievalists
Wesleyan University alumni
University of Chicago alumni
Stanford University faculty
American academics of English literature
Journalists from New York City
Historians from New York (state)
Alumni of Hertford College, Oxford